Jin Peiyu (born April 17, 1985, in Harbin) is a Chinese female speed skater.

She competed for China at the 2010 Winter Olympics in the 500m and 1000m events.

References

1985 births
Living people
Sportspeople from Harbin
Chinese female speed skaters
Olympic speed skaters of China
Speed skaters at the 2010 Winter Olympics
Universiade medalists in speed skating
Universiade gold medalists for China
Competitors at the 2009 Winter Universiade